Wally Lovett (born 15 December 1961) is an indigenous former  Australian rules football player who played in the Victorian Football League (VFL) in 1982 for Collingwood and in 1983 and 1984 for Richmond. He later played in the VFA for Brunswick.

References

 Hogan P: The Tigers Of Old, Richmond FC, Melbourne 1996

External links
 
 

1961 births
Living people
Brunswick Football Club players
Collingwood Football Club players
Richmond Football Club players
Heywood Football Club players
Indigenous Australian players of Australian rules football
Australian rules footballers from Victoria (Australia)